Roberto Spampatti (born 28 December 1965 in Clusone, Italy) is a retired Italian alpine skier.

References

External links
 

1965 births
Living people
Italian male alpine skiers
People from Clusone
Sportspeople from the Province of Bergamo